St. Lorenz Basilica  is a baroque minor Basilica in Kempten, Bavaria, named after the Christian martyr Lawrence of Rome. It is the former abbey church of the Benedictine Kempten Abbey. It is currently used as the parish church of the Roman Catholic parish of St. Lawrence in the Diocese of Augsburg.

History
There is evidence of a first church from the eighth century and the three-nave late Gothic parish church "St. Lorenz uffm Berg" on the hill of the Basilika St. Lorenz built on the site in the 13th Century but burned down in 1478.

In 1632, during the Thirty Years' War, the monastery and church were looted and destroyed by the Swedes and the citizens of the nearby imperial city of Kempten. 

Prince-Abbot Roman Giel von Gielsberg, commissioned the master builder Michael Beer of Vorarlberg to build a new church to serve the parish and monastery.  The foundation stone of the Basilica of St. Lawrence was laid on 13 April 1652.  This was one of the first large churches built in Germany after the end of the Thirty Years' War. The building included a residence for the Prince-abbots.

Beer built the nave, the ground floor of the towers and the choir. He was succeeded by Johann Serro on 24 March 1654. Benefactress Hildegard of the Vinzgau is commemorated in one of the ceiling paintings. The Nikolausaltar is in the north aisle. The church was consecrated on 12 May 1748.

In 1803 the monastery was dissolved and the church became a purely parish church.

In 1900 the twin towers were finally completed. They were built of concrete which is heavier than the used material before that time. Cracks at the connections to the main building are the result of the completed towers.

In 1969 Pope Paul VI bestowed the honorary title of basilica minor.

In December and January, the Bründl Baroque nativity scene can be viewed on selected dates in the crypt below the choir of the Basilika.

References

External links
 Website of the parish of St. Lorenz in Kempten

Basilica churches in Germany
Kempten
Roman Catholic churches in Bavaria
Church buildings with domes
Building and structure articles needing translation from German Wikipedia